Christopher Horodecki (born September 24, 1987) is a Polish-Canadian mixed martial artist. He has competed for the WEC, the IFL, Bellator, TKO Major League MMA, and Palace Fighting Championship.

Background
Horodecki was born in London, Ontario, Canada. At age 13, he attended a seminar run by Shawn Tompkins in Port Stanley and became "addicted" to mixed martial arts.

Mixed martial arts career

International Fight League
Chris made his debut knocking out Erik Owings at IFL: Championship 2006. He then scored victories over Ed West, Ryan Schultz, Bart Palaszewski, Josh Odom and Shad Lierley. Chris then defeated Bart Palaszewski again that earned him a spot in the finals for the lightweight title.

Horodecki was then defeated by Ryan Schultz in the finals of the 2007 IFL Grand Prix.

Affliction
Chris was originally scheduled to fight Dan Lauzon at Affliction: Day of Reckoning but was denied his license for failing his physical. Chris then suffered from a bulging disc in his neck and has lost about 80% of his strength in his right arm. The fight was rescheduled to the next event, Affliction: Trilogy but the event was canceled.

World Extreme Cagefighting
Horodecki's coach Shawn Tompkins announced on October 19, 2009 that Chris had agreed on a contract with World Extreme Cagefighting.

He made his WEC debut against Anthony Njokuani on December 19, 2009 at WEC 45. Horodecki lost via first-round TKO, after Chris´ attempt to create distance by turning his back and running away, his opponent Njokuani caught him with a high kick to the head and followed up with punches on the ground.

Horodecki was expected to face Ed Ratcliff on June 20, 2010 at WEC 49, but just days before the event, Ratcliff pulled out of the event for undisclosed reasons. Horodecki instead faced WEC newcomer Danny Downes and won the fight via submission in the third round.

The fight between Horodecki and Ratcliff eventually took place on September 30, 2010 at WEC 51.  He won the fight via split decision.

Horodecki faced Donald Cerrone on December 16, 2010 at WEC 53.  He lost the fight via submission in the second round and was subsequently released from the promotion.

Bellator Fighting Championships
Horodecki made his Bellator debut against Chris Saunders at Bellator 47.  He won the fight via unanimous decision.

On November 12, 2011, Horodecki fought Mike Corey at Bellator 57 the bout ended in a Draw.

On April 6, 2012, Horodecki was defeated by Mike Richman at Bellator 64 in round one by knockout due to punches.

On May 9, 2014, Horodecki fought at Bellator 119 in Ontario, Canada.  Horodecki's opponent was announced to be Marlon Sandro. He lost via unanimous decision.

Independent Promotions
Chris Horodecki was scheduled to take on Kalvin Hackney in Sarnia, Ontario on October 19, in the Score Fighting Series. Prior to the fight Hackney was injured, and Horodecki instead was matched with Brad Cardinal. Cardinal and Horodecki clashed heads in the first round, causing a severe cut to Horodecki. The doctor stopped the fight after the first round, and the fight was subsequently declared a no contest.

With a lack of Ontario-based MMA events, Chris Horodecki accepted to fight Tim Smith at XFFC 2 in Grande Prairie, Alberta on July 20, 2013. Horodecki will return to the Lightweight division for a XFFC Lightweight Title fight. Horodecki won via arm triangle choke in round one to win the XFFC Lightweight Championship.

Chris will fight in his hometown of London, Ontario against Jason Dent on October 26, 2013 at Provincial Fighting Championship 1.  Unfortunately, Jason Dent pulled out of the fight and Frank Caraballo was named as a replacement. Horodecki won via unanimous decision.

World Series of Fighting
Chris Horodecki signed with the World Series of Fighting and was supposed to appear on the WSOF 7 event in Vancouver, British Columbia on December 7, 2013.  However, Horodecki never appeared on the WSOF 7 event.

Horodecki instead made his debut at WSOF 14 against Luis Huete on October 11, 2014 in Edmonton, Alberta. He won the fight via unanimous decision.

In his next fight for the promotion, Horodecki faced Lance Palmer for the WSOF Featherweight Championship on June 5, 2015 in the main event at WSOF 21.  He lost the fight via submission in the first round.

Personal life
Horodecki was also studying to become a paramedic.

Championships and accomplishments
Xcessive Force Fighting Championship
XFFC Lightweight Championship (One time)

Mixed martial arts record

|-
|Loss
|align=center|21–7–1 (1)
|Derek Gauthier
|KO (punches)
|TKO 36: Resurrection
|
|align=center|1
|align=center|0:35
|Montreal, Quebec, Canada
|
|-
|Loss
|align=center|21–6–1 (1)
|Lance Palmer
|Submission (neck crank)
|WSOF 21
|
|align=center|1
|align=center|4:28
|Edmonton, Alberta, Canada
|For the WSOF Featherweight Championship
|-
|Win
|align=center|21–5–1 (1)
|Luis Huete
|Decision (unanimous)
|WSOF 14
|
|align=center|3
|align=center|5:00
|Edmonton, Alberta, Canada
|
|-
|Loss
|align=center|20–5–1 (1)
|Marlon Sandro
|Decision (unanimous)
|Bellator 119
|
|align=center|3
|align=center|5:00
|Rama, Ontario Canada
|
|-
|Win
|align=center|20–4–1 (1)
| Frank Caraballo
|Decision (unanimous)
| PFC 1: Unrivaled 
|
|align=center| 3
|align=center| 5:00
|London, Ontario, Canada
| 
|-
|Win
|align=center|19–4–1 (1)
| Tim Smith
| Submission (arm-triangle choke)
| XFFC 2
|
|align=center| 1
|align=center| 2:56
|Grande Prairie, Alberta, Canada
| 
|-
|NC
|align=center|18–4–1 (1)
| Brad Cardinal
| NC (accidental head clash)
| Score Fighting Series 6
|
|align=center| 1
|align=center| 1:23
|Sarnia, Ontario, Canada
| 
|-
|Loss
|align=center|18–4–1
| Mike Richman
| KO (punches)
| Bellator 64
|
|align=center| 1
|align=center| 1:23
|Windsor, Ontario, Canada
|
|-
| Draw
|align=center|18–3–1
|  Mike Corey
| Draw (majority)
| Bellator 57
|
|align=center| 3
|align=center| 5:00
|Rama, Ontario, Canada
| 
|-
|Win
|align=center|18–3
| Chris Saunders
| Decision (unanimous)
| Bellator 47
|
|align=center| 3
|align=center| 5:00
|Rama, Ontario, Canada
|
|-
|Win
|align=center|17–3
| David Castillo
| Submission (rear-naked choke)
| MMA 1: The Reckoning
|
|align=center| 1
|align=center| 4:24
|Rama, Ontario, Canada
|
|-
|Loss
|align=center|16–3
| Donald Cerrone
| Submission (triangle choke)
| WEC 53
|
|align=center| 2
|align=center| 2:43
|Glendale, Arizona, United States
|
|-
|Win
|align=center|16–2
| Ed Ratcliff
| Decision (split)
| WEC 51
|
|align=center| 3
|align=center| 5:00
|Broomfield, Colorado, United States
|
|-
|Win
|align=center|15–2
| Danny Downes
| Submission (rear-naked choke)
| WEC 49
|
|align=center| 3
|align=center| 1:09
|Edmonton, Alberta, Canada
|
|-
|Loss
|align=center|14–2
| Anthony Njokuani
| TKO (head kick and punches)
| WEC 45
|
|align=center| 1
|align=center| 3:33
|Las Vegas, Nevada, United States
|
|-
|Win
|align=center|14–1
| William Sriyapai
| Submission (rear-naked choke)
| Ultimate Chaos
|
|align=center| 1
|align=center| 4:02
|Biloxi, Mississippi, United States
|
|-
|Win
|align=center|13–1
|  Nate Lamotte
| Decision (unanimous)
| IFL: East Rutherford
|
|align=center| 3
|align=center| 5:00
|East Rutherford, New Jersey, United States
|
|-
|Loss
|align=center|12–1
|  Ryan Schultz
| TKO (punches)
| IFL: World Grand Prix
|
|align=center| 1
|align=center| 2:51
|Uncasville, Connecticut, United States
| For IFL Lightweight Championship.
|-
|Win
|align=center|12–0
|  Bart Palaszewski
| Decision (split)
| IFL: World Grand Prix
|
|align=center| 3
|align=center| 4:00
|Hoffman Estates, Illinois, United States
| <small>World Grand Prix Semi-Finals.
|-
|Win
|align=center|11–0
|  Shad Lierley
| Decision (unanimous)
| IFL: Everett
|
|align=center| 3
|align=center| 4:00
|Everett, Washington, United States
|
|-
|Win
|align=center|10–0
|  Josh Odom
| Decision (unanimous)
| IFL: Los Angeles
|
|align=center| 3
|align=center| 4:00
|Los Angeles, California, United States
|
|-
|Win
|align=center|9–0
|  Bart Palaszewski
| Decision (split)
| IFL: Houston
|
|align=center| 3
|align=center| 4:00
|Houston, Texas, United States
|
|-
|Win
|align=center|8–0
|  Ryan Schultz
| TKO (head kick and punches)
| IFL: World Championship Semi-Finals
|
|align=center| 2
|align=center| 0:24
|Portland, Oregon, United States
|
|-
|Win
|align=center|7–0
|  Ed West
| Decision (unanimous)
| IFL: Portland
|
|align=center| 3
|align=center| 4:00
|Portland, Oregon, United States
|
|-
|Win
|align=center|6–0
|  Erik Owings
| KO (head kick)
| IFL: Championship 2006
|
|align=center| 1
|align=center| 4:00
|Atlantic City, New Jersey, United States
|
|-
|Win
|align=center|5–0
|  Mike Bell
| TKO (punches)
| TKO Major League MMA 25: Confrontation
|
|align=center| 2
|align=center| 2:38
|Montreal, Quebec, Canada
|
|-
|Win
|align=center|4–0
|  Dave Pariseau
| TKO (punches)
| TKO 24: Eruption
|
|align=center| 1
|align=center| 2:48
|Laval, Quebec, Canada
|
|-
|Win
|align=center|3–0
|  Dave Goulet
| KO (head kick)
| TKO 23: Extreme
|
|align=center| 3
|
|Victoriaville, Quebec, Canada
|
|-
|Win
|align=center|2–0
|  Stephane Laliberte
| TKO (punches)
| TKO 22: Lionheart
|
|align=center| 2
|align=center| 2:52
|Montreal, Quebec, Canada
|
|-
|Win
|align=center|1–0
|  Matt McDonald
| TKO (doctor stoppage)
| UCW 2 - Caged Inferno
|
|align=center| 3
|align=center| 1:21
|Winnipeg, Manitoba, Canada
|

See also
 List of Bellator MMA alumni

References

External links

1987 births
Canadian male mixed martial artists
Canadian people of Polish descent
Lightweight mixed martial artists
Living people
Polish male mixed martial artists
Sportspeople from London, Ontario